Free climbing is a form of rock climbing in which the climber can only use climbing equipment for climbing protection, but not as an aid to help in their progression in ascending the route.  Free climbing therefore cannot use any of the tools that are used in aid climbing to help overcome the obstacles encountered while ascending a route.  The development of free climbing was an important moment in the history of rock climbing, including the concept and definition of what determined a first free ascent (or FFA) of a route by a climber.

History

The free climbing movement was an important development in the history of rock climbing. In 1911, Austrian climber Paul Preuss started what became known as the Mauerhakenstreit (or "piton dispute"), by advocating for a transition to "free climbing" via a series of essays and articles in the German Alpine Journal where he defined "artificial aid" and proposed 6 rules of free climbing including the important rule 4: "The piton is an emergency aid and not the basis of a system of mountaineering". In 1913, German climber Rudolf Fehrmann published the second edition of Der Bergsteiger in der Sächsischen Schweiz (or The Climber in Saxon Switzerland), which included the first binding rules for climbing in the area to protect the soft sandstone rock. The rules said that only natural holds were allowed, and these "rules for free climbing" are in still use today.

In 1975, German climber Kurt Albert painted his first "Rotpunkt" (or redpoint) on the base of the aid climb Adolf Rott Ged.-Weg (V+/A1), in the Frankenjura, signifying he had "free climbed" it as a redpoint (i.e. after many failed attempts); the redpoint became the accepted definition of what constituted a "first free ascent".

First free ascent

The first "free climb" of a climbing route, is known as the first free ascent, or FFA, and is chronicled by climbing journals and guide books. They also chronicle whether the "free climb" was done onsight (i.e. first try with no prior information), flashed (i.e. first try but had prior information), or  redpointed (i.e. completed after a first failed attempt).  FFAs that create new grade milestones, are important events in climbing history.

Types

Free climbing means using no forms of artificial or mechanical aid to help progression in ascending a route.  Even the act of pulling on the climbing protection equipment (either placed by the climber while climbing or already in situ with pre-placed bolts), is considered aid climbing and carries an aid climbing grade of A0.

Free climbing can be performed in a variety of types of climbing, and most importantly:

 Traditional climbing, where temporary climbing protection equipment is used (placed by the climber as they ascend the route), but not for any form of aid in progression on the climbing route.
 Sport climbing, where pre-placed fixed bolts are used for climbing protection, but again, not for any form of aid in progression on the climbing route.
 Bouldering, as no forms of additional devices are employed in bouldering, it is by definition, free climbing.
 Free solo climbing, as no forms of additional devices are employed in soloing, it is by definition, free climbing.

Misunderstandings

Free climbing has been called "rock climbing's most commonly mistaken term", with problems including:

 Incorrectly assuming that "free climbing" always means solo climbing, i.e. that you must always be alone and without any partner.  Free climbing in traditional climbing and sport climbing uses a supporting belayer.
 Incorrectly assuming that "free climbing" always means free soloing, i.e. that you must never use any climbing protection equipment. Free climbing in traditional climbing and sport climbing uses climbing protection (but not to aid progression).
 Incorrectly assuming that "free climbing" always means onsighting or flashing, i.e. that you must always climb the route first try. Free climbing in traditional climbing and sport climbing also uses the redpoint as a definition of a first free ascent.

Free climbing is related to, but separate from, the broader climbing topic area of clean climbing; however, clean climbing does not support bolted sport climbing routes on natural rock, and thus external redpointed first free ascents are not advocated.

References

Further reading
How to Rock Climb, John Long

Types of climbing